Roy Laidlaw (1883–1936) was a Canadian film actor of the silent era.

Selected filmography

 The Darkening Trail (1915)
 Bullets and Brown Eyes (1916)
 The Patriot (1916)
 The Vagabond Prince (1916)
 Sweetheart of the Doomed (1917)
 The Gunfighter (1917)
 With Hoops of Steel (1918)
 An Alien Enemy (1918)
 His Robe of Honor (1918)
 A Law Unto Herself (1918)
 Honor's Cross (1918)
 Shackled (1918)
 The Turn of a Card (1918)
 Back to God's Country (1919)
 Are You Legally Married? (1919)
 The Great Accident (1920)
 Cupid the Cowpuncher (1920)
 The Deadlier Sex (1920)
 Live Sparks (1920)
 The Ace of Hearts (1921)
 The Poverty of Riches (1921)
 Fools and Riches (1923)
 The Hunchback of Notre Dame (1923)
 The Gaiety Girl (1924)
 The Snob (1294)
 Where Romance Rides (1925)
 The Splendid Road (1925)
 The Ridin' Streak (1925)
 The White Desert (1925)
 Never Too Late (1925)
 The Right Man (1925)
 When the Door Opened (1925)
 The Devil's Gulch (1926)
 Bred in Old Kentucky (1926)
 Is That Nice? (1926)
 Beyond the Rockies (1926)
 Cactus Trails (1927)
 God's Great Wilderness (1927)
 Not for Publication (1927)
 The Wild West Show (1928)

References

Bibliography
 Katchmer, George A. A Biographical Dictionary of Silent Film Western Actors and Actresses. McFarland, 2015.
 Solomon, Aubrey. The Fox Film Corporation, 1915-1935: A History and Filmography. McFarland, 2011.

External links

1883 births
1936 deaths
Canadian male film actors
Male actors from Ontario
Canadian emigrants to the United States